Pramila Joshai is an Indian actress in the Kannada film industry. Some of the films of Pramila Joshai as an actor include Saheba (2017), Thayi (2008), Apthamitra (2004). She was credited as Parimalam in her debut Tamil film Vaidehi Kathirunthal (1984) which became a blockbuster hit and has attained cult status over the years.

Awards

Career
Pramila Joshai has been part of more than 120 movies in Kannada.

Selected filmography

 Bahuparak (2017)
 Chamkayisi Chindi Udayisi (2009)
 Apthamitra (2004)
 Hagalu Vesha (2000)
 Annavra Makkalu (1996)
 Chirabandhavya (1993)
 Prathama Ushakirana (1990)
 Shubha Milana (1987)
 Vaidehi Kathirunthal (1984) (Tamil film; Credited as Parimalam)
 Mutthaide Bhagya (1983)
 Haddina Kannu (1980)
 Vijay Vikram (1979)
 Thappu Thalangal (1978) - Tamil debut (Also in Kannada)
 Thayigintha Devarilla (1977)

Personal life
Pramila Joshai is married to Sundar Raj, and they have a daughter named Meghana Raj. Both Sundar Raj and Meghana Raj are Indian film actors in the Kannada film industry, while Meghana has worked in Malayalam , Telugu, Kannada and Tamil films.

Pramila Joshai is a Catholic.

See also

List of people from Karnataka
Cinema of Karnataka
List of Indian actresses
Cinema of India

References

External links

Actresses in Kannada cinema
Actresses in Tamil cinema
Living people
Kannada people
Actresses from Karnataka
Actresses from Bangalore
Indian film actresses
Indian Roman Catholics
21st-century Indian actresses
Actresses in Kannada television
1955 births